Krzysztof Radzikowski (born August 18, 1981) is a professional strongman competitor from Głowno, Poland. He has competed in 112 International strongman competitions (2nd highest in history) and have won 23 of them, making him the fifth most decorated strongman in history behind Žydrūnas Savickas, Mariusz Pudzianowski, Hafþór Júlíus Björnsson and Brian Shaw.

Strongman career

Radzikowski competed regularly in the Strongman Super Series during 2008-2010, as well as Poland's Strongest Man, and the World Log Lift Championships finishing 2nd in 2009.

Radzikowski won the Giants Live Poland event on August 6, 2011. This victory qualified him for the 2011 World's Strongest Man contest, his first time in WSM, but he failed to qualify for the finals.

Radzikowski won the inaugural 2012 WSF World Strongmen Championships on February 14, 2012 in Dubai, UAE. Krzysztof also won the WSF World Cup Uzbekistan in Tashkent, Uzbekistan on March 30, 2012.

Radzikowski won the Giants Live Poland event on July 21, 2012. This victory qualifies him for the 2012 World's Strongest Man contest. He also won the Elite Strongman:Moscow event on Aug. 1, 2012 in Moscow, Russia.

Radzikowski made the finals of the 2012 World's Strongest Man contest in Los Angeles, California and finished in 6th place overall.

Radzikowski has competed regularly in the Strongman Champions League 2012 season, finishing third in Poland and second in Spain.

Radzikowski finished second at the 2012 World Log Lift Championships, and second at the 2012 Arnold Strongman Classic-Europe.

Radzikowski finished third at the 2012 SCL Finals held in Fort-de-France, Martinique, and fourth overall for the 2012 SCL season.

Radzikowski finished in fourth place at the 2013 Arnold Strongman Classic, his first appearance in the contest.

Radzikowski has won 3 SCL contests so far in the 2013 season, the SCL Iceman Challenge IV in Finland, and in the Czech Republic and Portugal. He is the current SCL overall leader for the season.

Personal records
Squat – 400 kg (881.8 lb)
Bench Press – 300 kg (661.4 lb)
Deadlift – 430 kg (947.7 lb) with wrist straps.
Deadlift – 410 kg (903.6 lb) Raw, no wrist straps.
Log Lift – 217,5 kg (479,5 lbs) - Polish record
Clean and Press – 175 kg (385.7 lb) for 10 "easy" reps.
 Viking press –  x 15 reps (2016 SCL Norway)
Overhead Press – 240 kg (530 lb).

See also
List of Poles

References

1981 births
Living people
Polish strength athletes
Sportspeople from Łódź